Milos R. Popovic is a scientist specializing in Functional Electrical Stimulation (FES) and neurorehabilitation. As of 2018, he is  Director of the KITE Research Institute at UHN Toronto Rehabilitation Institute (TRI), and a Professor with the Institute of Biomaterials and Biomedical Engineering at the University of Toronto.

Education 

Popovic received a Dipl. of Electrical Engineering from the University of Belgrade in his native Serbia in 1990. He then earned his Ph.D in Mechanical Engineering from the University of Toronto in 1996... His Ph.D thesis was on Friction modelling and control, under supervision of Andrew Goldenberg.

Career

Academic work 
In July 2001, Popovic established The Rehabilitation Engineering Laboratory (REL) at the Lyndhurst Centre of Toronto Rehabilitation Institute. The laboratory supports multiple research groups, under supervision of 6 principal investigators, including the Popovic lab. In 2018, Popovic was appointed   TRI's Director of Research. He is also the leader of the Neural Engineering and Therapeutics research team at iDAPT (Intelligent Design for Adaptation, Participation, and Technology), which works on translation of rehabilitative research info advanced therapeutic tools.

Functional electrical stimulation  
Functional electrical stimulation (FES) uses bursts of short electrical pulses to generate muscle contraction. Application of these electrical pulses to motor nerves results in generation of an action potential along the axon of that nerve towards its targeted muscle. With electrodes placed on the skin over the  muscle, individuals attempt to move their muscle by sending a signal with their brain to the muscle. The muscle is then stimulated by the system, causing a contraction which sends a signal from the muscle to the brain. Thus, a new neural pathway is formed, which improves recovery of voluntary movement.

Popovic has led studies investigating the use of FES in the rehabilitation of muscular function for stroke victims with extremely limited arm and hand mobility in comparison with conventional therapy. One of the best-known publications is "Rehabilitation of Reaching and Grasping Function in Severe Hemiplegic Patients Using Functional Electrical Stimulation Therapy", conducted in 2008. Electrical impulses to activate muscles were used in combination with verbal cues, and over the course of the treatment period, less FES was necessary to achieve the desired movements. Patients using FES in the study showed significant improvement in object manipulation, palmar grip torque, and pinch grip pulling force when compared to those using only conventional therapy.

Brain-machine interfaces 
Popovic is   involved in the development of various brain-machine interfaces (BMI) for use in humans, using implantable electrocorticographic (ECoG) and surface electroencephalographic (EEG) electrode. A neuroprosthesis study conducted using ECoG achieved high accuracy in producing intended grasp-and-release functionality in the hand. Real-time asynchronous control of a remote-controlled car was achieved using a single EEG electrode to eliminate restrictions related to information transfer rates. Work within this field tests the feasibility and functionality of using invasive and non-invasive physiological signals to improve implementation of FES as a rehabilitation method.

Compex Motion simulator 
Popovic developed Compex Motion, a portable and programmable system used for transcutaneous FES, in collaboration with Swiss company Compex SA. The stimulator can be programmed to generate a variety of stimulation sequences, can be connected to other systems to increase channel capabilities, and can be controlled externally. The device can be used in the development of neuroprostheses, and muscle exercise systems. This work provided the foundation for the use of FES in SCI rehabilitation.

Industry 
In 2008, Popovic co-founded medical technology company MyndTec based on the FES system that has been a focus of his research. The firm  develops MyndMove, a transcutaneous FES therapy to improve function and maximize independence for patients with stroke- and spinal-cord injury-related paralysis.

Professional activities 
In 2004, he was a co-founder of the Canadian National Spinal Cord Injury Conference, and since acts as a co-chair for the annual event. As part of his work with iDAPT, he also contributed to the Spinal Cord Injury: A Manifesto for Change.

Honours and awards 
National level awards are listed below:

 2018: Jonas Salk Award - March of Dimes, Toronto, Ontario
 2013: Health Technology Exchange - Morris (Mickey) Milner Award for outstanding contributions in Assistive Technologies
 2011: Elected to College of Fellows of the American Institute of Medical and Biological Engineering
 1997: Swiss National Science Foundation Technology Transfer Award - 1st place (with Thierry Keller)

Notable publications

References

External links 
 R. Popovic   U Toronto faculty page
 Google Scholar profile: https://scholar.google.ca/citations?user=PsSTeg4AAAAJ&hl=en&oi=ao 

REL page: http://reltoronto.ca/

Canadian engineers
Serbian engineers
Living people
Academic staff of the University of Toronto
University of Toronto alumni
Year of birth missing (living people)